Vienna is an unincorporated community about  from Mississippi in Pickens County, Alabama, United States.  It was a prosperous river port from the 1830s until the American Civil War, situated along the eastern shore of the Tombigbee River on the southwestern border of the county.  It declined rapidly in importance with the building of a railroad through Pickens County following the war.  In 1917 the post office closed and this marked the end of Vienna's official status as a town.

Demographics

Vienna was listed as an incorporated community in the U.S. Censuses of 1900 and 1910. It disincorporated before 1920 and has not appeared on the census since.

Geography

References

Unincorporated communities in Alabama
Unincorporated communities in Pickens County, Alabama
Ghost towns in Alabama
Ghost towns in the United States
Ghost towns in North America